Wad Hamid is a city on the Nile about 100 kilometres north of Khartoum, Sudan. Most of the people are farmers. Wad Hamid is part of Almatama Province. Wad Hamid is the center of a big area constituted of many villages and islands, a few to mention is : Hilat Alsheekh Alaabass, Shubra, Hwaweet, Medississa, Alghlaa, Hajer Alteer, Wad Alhabashi, Althawra, Omjerky, Nagazou, and Salamtoo. Wad Hamid is near the Nile Sixth Cataract. Most of its residence come from one family. 

Naqa, an ancient city is located southeast of the city.

Populated places in River Nile (state)